, better known by her stage name , is a Japanese actress. She is also a model and has participated in several commercials.

Career
In 1995, Asō made her film debut in Bad Guy Beach. With her role in the 1998 film Dr. Akagi, she received several major awards, including a Japan Academy Prize for Best Supporting Actress.

She has appeared in Kiyoshi Kurosawa's films such as License to Live and Pulse. She played a leading role in the 2007 Iranian-Japanese film Hafez.

Personal life
In December 2007, Asō married stylist Daisuke Iga. In 2012, she gave birth to their first child.

Filmography

Films
 Bad Guy Beach (1995)
 License to Live (1998)
 Dr. Akagi (1998)
 Second Chance (1999)
 Himawari (2000)
 Kaza Hana (2000)
 Ring 0: Birthday (2000)
 Pop Beat Killers (2000)
 Luxurious Bone (2001)
 Red Shadow (2001)
 Rush! (2001)
 Pulse (2001)
 Stereo Future (2001)
 Last Scene (2002)
 11'9"01 September 11 (2002)
 Inochi (2002)
 Samurai Resurrection (2003)
 Slow Is Beautiful (2003)
 Iden & Tity (2003)
 Casshern (2004)
 Eiko (2004)
 Zebraman (2004)
 Aoi Kuruma (2004)
 Yajikita (2005)
 Hasami Otoko (2005)
 The Uchoten Hotel (2006)
 Hafez (2007)
 Town of Evening Calm, Country of Cherry Blossoms (2007)
 Dororo (2007)
 Cafe Isobe (2008)
 Kodomo no Kodomo (2008)
 Romantic Prelude (2009)
 Beauty (2009)
 Instant Swamp (2009)
 Love Strikes! (2011)
 G'mor Evian! (2012)
 Love & Peace (2015)
 The Boy and the Beast (2015) (voice)
 The Actor (2016)
 Samurai's Promise (2018)
 Mirai (2018) (voice)
 Louder!: Can't Hear What You're Singin', Wimp (2018)
 Tonde Saitama (2019)
 Birthday Wonderland (2019), Midori (voice)
 State of Emergency (2020)
 Masquerade Night (2021)
 Tombi: Father and Son (2022), Misako Ichikawa
 Yes I Can't Swim (2022), Miyako
 Lonely Castle in the Mirror (2022), Kokoro's mother (voice)
 Eternal New Mornings (2023)

Television
 Time Limit Investigator (2006)
 Time Limit Investigator, Season 2 (2007)
 Kaiki Renai Sakusen (2015)
 Dele (2018)
 Time Limit Investigator 2019 (2019)
 Idaten (2019), Kikue Tabata
 Bullets, Bones and Blocked Noses (2021)

Awards
 1998: 23rd Hochi Film Award - Best Supporting Actress
 1998: 1st International Communication Festa - Best Communication Person Award
 1999: 22nd Japan Academy Prize - Best Supporting Actress
 1999: 8th Japan Movie Critic Award - Rookie of the year
 1999: 24th Osaka Film Festival - Rookie of the year
 1999: 20th Yokohama Film Festival - Rookie of the year
 2002: 11th Japan Movie Professional Award - Best Actress
 2002: 16th Takasaki Film Festival - Best Actress Award
 2007: 32nd Hochi Film Awards - Best Actress
 2007: 50th Blue Ribbon Awards - Best Actress
 2007: Mainichi Film Awards - Best Actress

References

External links
 
 

1978 births
Living people
People from Sanmu
Japanese actresses
Actors from Chiba Prefecture